Philadelphia Stars  may refer to:

 Philadelphia Stars (baseball), a baseball team in the Negro leagues from 1933 to 1952
 Philadelphia/Baltimore Stars, an American football team in the United States Football League from 1983 to 1984, after which they became the Baltimore Stars for their final season in 1985
 Philadelphia Stars (2022), an American football team in the revived United States Football League in 2022